The 15th Cavalry Division (15-ya Kavaleriiskaya Diviziya) was a cavalry formation of the Russian Imperial Army.

Organization
1st Cavalry Brigade
15th Regiment of Dragoons
15th Uhlan Regiment
2nd Cavalry Brigade
15th Regiment of Hussars
15th Regiment of Cossacks
15th Horse Artillery Division

Commanders
1891–1897: Alexander Kaulbars
1897–1899: Georgii Stackelberg

References

Cavalry divisions of the Russian Empire
Military units and formations disestablished in 1918